"The Bowery" is a song from the musical A Trip to Chinatown with music by Percy Gaunt and lyrics by Charles H. Hoyt. The musical toured the country for several years and then opened on Broadway in 1891.

Description
The song is written in 3/4 time in a major key. The lyrics describe an incident in New York City and have nothing to do with the plot, a story set in San Francisco.  They consist of six verses interspersed with the chorus, which ends with the vow:

The Bowery, the Bowery,
I'll never go there anymore!

Although the Bowery neighbourhood of New York City was where theater life flourished from about 1860 to 1875, by the 1880s it had become a sordid district.  The experience of the singer is described in part by the Village Voice newspaper:

He's [the singer] buttonholed by a grifter and conned by a shopkeeper before entering "a concert hall," where he starts a row because he thinks "A New Coon in Town" is directed at him. Bye-bye rube: "A man called a bouncer attended to me./I'll never go there any more."

Lyrics

History
The Producer / playwright / lyricist, Charles H. Hoyt (1849–1900), collaborated on at least 11 musicals with conductor / composer Percy Gaunt (1852–1896).  Hoyt, who has been called the Father of American Farce, developed a style in his musicals based upon fast action, outrageous situations, witty dialogue, dancing, acrobatics, and singing. The meager plot of A Trip to Chinatown did not remain constant during its long run but varied with changes in novelty acts, songs, characters, and lines. One constant was The Bowery, which had been interpolated initially to shore up the musical's appeal. The strategy proved successful, and The Bowery became a major factor in the show's success. It was introduced on Broadway by comic Harry Conor. A Trip to Chinatown ran for 650 performances and set a Broadway record which would stand for 20 years. The Bowery sold more than a million copies of sheet music and has remained a familiar song.

Bing Crosby included the song in a medley on his album Join Bing and Sing Along  (1959)

Notes

External links
 The Bowery (mp3 file) from Internet Archive.
Recording by the New York Light Opera
Willa Cather review of touring production of A Trip to Chinatown in 1894

1891 songs
Bowery
Comedy songs
Songs about New York City
Songs from musicals